Ihuatzio, which translates to "Land of Coyotes" in the Purépecha language, is a town located near Lake Pátzcuaro in the Mexican state of Michoacán. It was once the capital of the Purépecha kingdom. It was the capital until the change to Tzintzuntzan.

Archaeological site

Ihuatzio is also the name of an archeological site located at the southern slopes of “Cerro Tarhiata K'eri”, just north of the town of Ihuatzio, in the Tzintzuntzan municipality, of Michoacán state. The site is some 7 kilometers south-east of Tzintzuntzan, on the south-eastern shore of the Lake Pátzcuaro. Human settlements vestiges are registered from two different occupational periods; the first occurred between 900 and 1200 CE, corresponding to Nahuatl language speaking groups; the second group corresponding to the maximum development reached by the Purépecha culture, between 1200 and 1530 CE.

Mexico Instituto Nacional de Antropologial e Historia. Mexico Consejo Nacional para la Cultura y las Artes.

Populated places in Michoacán